The Trapp Family Lodge is a  resort located in Stowe, Vermont. It is managed by Sam von Trapp, son of Johannes von Trapp of the Austrian musical family, the Trapps. It was formerly known as Cor Unum (Latin for One Heart).

History 
The Trapp family was largely fictionalized in the 1959 musical The Sound of Music, which was loosely based on the 1949 book The Story of the Trapp Family Singers by Maria von Trapp. Baron Georg von Trapp and his wife Maria left Austria shortly after its annexation by Nazi Germany in 1938 and settled with their family in Vermont in 1942. After the Baron's death in 1947, the family expanded and operated their home as a 30-room ski lodge. The ski-lodge was later expanded in 1968 to fit twenty more rooms. It was destroyed by fire on December 20, 1980, forcing 45 people to flee in their nightclothes, including Baroness von Trapp. The body of a guest was found later in the rubble. A new Austrian-style lodge with 93 rooms was opened in 1983.

After the death of Maria von Trapp in 1987, 32 family members shared ownership of the lodge. Johannes von Trapp instigated a merger to eliminate the interests of other family members in 1994. Family members were displeased by the terms of the merger and fought back with legal proceedings about the amount to be paid to them in exchange for their shares, and the controversy went to the Supreme Court of Vermont.

Facilities
The Lodge offers cross country skiing and mountain biking trails, fitness center, tennis courts, pools, and wagon and sleigh rides. The lodge houses a restaurant, lounge, and gift shop. As a working farm they produce their own maple syrup, raise Scottish Highland cattle, chickens, pigs, and grow their own vegetables for use in their three restaurants. 

The meadow at the Lodge was one of the principal sites for the annual Vermont Mozart Festival.

von Trapp Brewing 
In 2010, the Lodge began to brew beer, initially under the name Trapp Lager. In 2016, the von Trapp Bierhall opened down the hill from the Lodge, serving food and beverages.

Family cemetery
A cemetery in the grounds of the Lodge contains the graves of several family members, including Maria and Georg.

Cross-country skiing 
During the winter of 1968–69, Johannes von Trapp, then president of Trapp Family Lodge Inc., came up with an idea to start cross-country skiing trails at the Lodge.

Sources

External links 

Ski areas and resorts in Vermont
Trapp family
Buildings and structures in Stowe, Vermont
Tourist attractions in Lamoille County, Vermont
Hotels in Vermont
1983 establishments in Vermont